Blakenham Priory was an estate in monastic ownership in the late Middle Ages, located at Great Blakenham  in Suffolk, England.

Foundation
In  the reign of King William Rufus (1087-1100), Walter Giffard  was made 1st Earl of Buckingham. Walter the younger  inherited this considerable portfolio by 1085 and was made Earl, probably in 1097.  

This wealthy and highly visible and active nobleman at some time in William Rufus’ reign donated the manor of Blakenham  to the great abbey of Bec

Bec was a Benedictine monastic foundation in Normandy,  not far from  Rouen. Founded  in 1034, it became through the magnetic presence of the erudite   Lanfranc of Pavia  a focus of 11th century intellectual life, which developed further under its second abbot,  Anselm. Both  Lanfranc and Anselm were considerable international figures and both became  in turn Archbishop of Canterbury. So it was that  Bec   became  the most influential monastic centre of the 12th-century Anglo-Norman kingdom.

Many of the  companions in arms and  followers of William the Conqueror supported the abbey, enriching it with extensive properties in England, where Bec possessed in the 15th century several priories, namely, St Neots, Stoke-by-Clare, Wilsford,   Steventon, Cowick,  Ogbourne,  and at some point also Blakenham and Povington Priory.   St Neots Priory was particularly large.  Bec also had  Goldcliff Priory in Monmouthshire.

The London suburb of Tooting Bec takes its name from the medieval village’s having been a possession of Bec Abbey.

Management
An estate of this size would  have required supervision,  probably of one or two monks, who would have their chapel and offices at the manor house in early days. In fact it is only some  time after the grant that  Blakenham is named as a distinct alien priory or cell. The term “priory” in this context was a conventual indication of monastic possession and does not necessarily imply monastic buildings, at least of  any size. Instead of "priory", the terms "cell" or even "parcel" are also found. For a long time Blakenham was under the charge of the prior of  Ruislip  in Middlesex. Ruislip, Middlesex. Bec’s ownership of the manor of Blakenham was contested in the 1220s by  one Thomas Ardern, but with the involvement of the crown, the rights of the prior of Ruislip as representing Bec Abbey  were recognized. At a later point the point of administrative reference for Blakenham  as a Bec property became the prior of  Ogbourne or  Okeburne in Wiltshire, whose involvement is  mentioned in 1291 and 1325.

An Alien Priory
As an alien priory (i.e., the dependency of a French mother-house) Blakenham would have had a certain instability of status before the English crown, especially  whenever there were hostilities between France and England, and particularly  during the Hundred Years' War. Its fate would have shared the fluctuating fortunes of every  alien priory. These fluctuations were resolved for Blakenham when in  the 19th year of the reign of Henry VI (1 September 1440 - -31 August 1441) the property of Blakenham Priory was granted  to Eton College, a grant confirmed under Edward IV in 1467.

References

Monasteries in Suffolk
Alien priories in England
Benedictine monasteries in England
Order of Saint Benedict